Salkocha is a village and gram panchayat in the town of Chapar in the Dhubri district of the state of Assam, India. It is part of the Bilasipara East Assam Legislative Assembly constituency and the Dhubri Lok Sabha constituency.

Location
Salkocha is connected to the rest of India through National Highway 31. Salkocha is near the villages of Gaurangtari, Kumarigaon, Porshanpara, Kamarpara, Khamarpara, Silgara, Gaurangtari, Tilapara, Bamunpara, Bhelupara, Sreegram, Hatipota, Pukhuripara, Silgara, Hapapara, Neogipara and Salbari.

Climate and hydrology
Salkocha is affected by annual flooding of the Brahmaputra and its tributaries, which flow through the western region.

Demographics
According to the 2011 Census of India, the Chapar-Salkocha block had a population of 118,800. Salkocha has a population of about 40,000, and an average literacy rate of 75 percent. The predominant religions are Hinduism and Islam. The village is populated by Rajbongshi people and other communities, including the Kalita and Sutradhar castes, the Bodo and Garo peoples, and the Rabha tribe. Salkocha's official language is Assamese, and a Goalpariya dialect is mainly spoken.

Points of interest

Burha-Burhi Temple: At Hapapara, north of Salkocha, a mela is held each April as part of the Burha-Burhi Puja. Ceremonies also take place in April at other temples.
Assam's first bird sanctuary,  from Kokrajhar, contains a variety of local and migratory birds. In the northeastern forest, the endangered golden langur may be seen. It is adjacent to the Chakrashila Wildlife Sanctuary.
 Dhir Beel: A marshy lake east of Salkocha, near the Bodo Hills and also adjacent to the Chakrashila Wildlife Sanctuary

Chakrashila Wildlife Sanctuary: Straddling the Kokrajhar and Dhubri districts a few kilometers from Salkocha, the  sanctuary is India's second protected habitat of the golden langur.

References

Villages in Dhubri district